The Mucca Pisana is a breed of cattle from Tuscany, in central Italy. It is one of the 16 minor Italian cattle breeds of limited diffusion recognised and protected by the Ministero delle Politiche Agricole Alimentari e Forestali, the Italian ministry of agriculture.

References